A medical cannabis card or medical marijuana card is a state-issued identification card that enables a patient with a doctor's recommendation to obtain, possess, or cultivate cannabis for medicinal use despite marijuana's lack of the normal Food and Drug Administration testing for safety and efficacy. These cards are issued by a state or county in which medical cannabis is recognized. Typically a patient is required to pay a fee to the state in order to obtain a medical marijuana card. Sometimes it is alternatively referred to as medical marijuana identification (MMID), or medical marijuana (MMJ).

In most states with medical marijuana card programs, the card is valid for up to 12 months and may be renewed. It usually needs another evaluation by the doctor and required to pay card fee again which costs less than initial registration. Legal states also have different requirements for obtaining a medical marijuana card. Medical marijuana cards in the United States are currently possible to obtain in 33 states, including 10 states with legalized recreational marijuana such as Washington, Colorado, California, and Massachusetts.

The process of acquiring medical marijuana card may vary with the specific State's Law and policies. Each of the 30 states does not have unique requirements for obtaining medical marijuana card, need to consult the laws of a specific state to determine.

See also 

 Medical cannabis in the United States

References

External links 
 State of California Medical Marijuana Program
 State of Montana Medical Marijuana Program
 State of Massachusetts Medical Marijuana Program
 A Definitive Guide On How to Get a New York Medical Marijuana Card
 How To Renew Medical Marijuana Card In New York

Medicinal use of cannabis